Loch Luna Reserve is a protected area covering the floodplain on the north side of the River Murray in South Australia between the towns of Kingston-on-Murray in the west and Cobdogla in the east. It was proclaimed on 7 November 1985 with exception to a parcel of land known as Sugarloaf Hill within the boundaries of the game reserve which has been excluded from protection for the purpose of mining activity. The Moorook Game Reserve immediately adjoins the game reserve's southern boundary. It and the Moorook Game Reserve are reported as providing "significant wildlife habitat and are popular recreation sites, particularly for river-based activities and camping". The game reserve is classified as an IUCN Category VI protected area. In 1989, it was listed on the now-defunct Register of the National Estate.

See also
Duck hunting in South Australia 
Riverland Biosphere Reserve

References

External links
Loch Luna and Moorook Game Reserves
Loch Luna Game Reserve brochure
Loch Luna Game Reserve webpage on protected planet

Game reserves of South Australia
Protected areas established in 1985
1985 establishments in Australia
South Australian places listed on the defunct Register of the National Estate
Murray River